Allison Thomas Stanislaus "Pooley" Hubert (April 6, 1901 – February 26, 1978) was an American football player and coach of football and basketball. Regarded as one of the South's greatest college football stars, he played quarterback for coach Wallace Wade's football teams at the University of Alabama from 1922 to 1925, leading Alabama to its first bowl game, the 1926 Rose Bowl, known as "the game that changed the South."  Wade called him "undoubtedly one of the greatest football players of all time." Hubert later became the head football and basketball coach at the at Mississippi State Teachers College—now known as University of Southern Mississippi—and Virginia Military Institute. He was inducted into the College Football Hall of Fame as a player in 1964.

Early years
Pooley dropped out of high school to fight in World War I. He attended Missouri Military Academy in Mexico, Missouri, where played football in the fall of 1920. Pooley earned a scholarship to play football at Princeton University, but arrived too late for the entrance exams. He tried a few other schools including Georgia Tech, for which he was one day late, before ultimately enrolling at the University of Alabama as a 20-year-old freshman.

University of Alabama
Pooley initially played tackle in college, but was eventually put in the backfield where he excelled at fullback and quarterback.  In those days of one-platoon football, players played on both offense, defense, and special teams. Not only was Hubert his team's best passer; he was also called the "greatest defensive back of all time."  He wore number 10. He stood 5'10" and 190 pounds.

In six different games he scored at least three touchdowns, and had 35 in all. Zipp Newman wrote "No player deserves more credit for getting Alabama started up the ladder than Hubert—a football coach on the field. He wasn't fast, but he could pass, punt, buck for short yardage, and inspired his teammates. There have been few field generals in Pooley's class." Herman Stegeman remarked that with Hubert in the game Alabama had the advantage another team would have by a coach on the field of play.

1924
Pooley was captain of the 1924 team which netted Alabama's first conference championship, as members of the Southern Conference. It suffered a lone upset to Herb Covington-led Centre. Hubert scored in the 14–0 win over Sewanee. In the 20–0 win over Furman, Hubert scored twice, once on a 4-yard run and next on a 35-yard off-tackle run. He threw two touchdowns in the win over Georgia to secure the conference. At year's end Hubert was chosen for the composite All-Southern team.

1925
Hubert played a key role in helping Alabama win the 1925 national championship. In the 7–0 win over Georgia Tech, the alumni recalled "Hubert played the greatest game of his career and was called the greatest defensive back ever to appear on Grant Field". Johnny Mack Brown returned a punt for the deciding touchdown, and Hubert cleared two Tech players out of the way. Hubert also passed for two touchdowns and ran for another in a 34–0 win against Florida. At year's end he was selected All-Southern.

The climax of his college career was the final game, defeating Wildcat Wilson-led Washington, 20–19, in the 1926 Rose Bowl. Hubert scored the first touchdown. He hit Brown on a 59-yard touchdown pass next to take the lead. He connected with Brown for yet another after a fumble. It is known as "the game that changed the South."

Coaching career and later life
In 1931, Hubert was appointed head football coach at Mississippi State Teachers College—now known as University of Southern Mississippi—in Hattiesburg, Mississippi. From 1931 to 1936, he led Mississippi State Teachers to a 26–24–5 record. From 1937 to 1946, he was the head football coach at Virginia Military Institute (VMI) in Lexington, Virginia, where he compiled a 43–45–8 record. His 1938 squad set a school record with four ties. His best season came in 1940, when he went 7–2–1.

Hubert later coached football at Waynesboro High School in Waynesboro, Georgia, where he owned a peach orchard. He died on February 26, 1978, at a Veterans Administration Hospital in Augusta, Georgia, following a lengthy illness.

Head coaching record

Football

Basketball

Notes

References

Bibliography

External links
 
 

1901 births
1978 deaths
American football fullbacks
American football quarterbacks
American football tackles
Alabama Crimson Tide football players
Southern Miss Golden Eagles baseball coaches
Southern Miss Golden Eagles football coaches
Southern Miss Golden Eagles basketball coaches
VMI Keydets football coaches
VMI Keydets basketball coaches
High school football coaches in Georgia (U.S. state)
All-Southern college football players
College Football Hall of Fame inductees
American military personnel of World War I
People educated at Missouri Military Academy
Sportspeople from Meridian, Mississippi
People from Waynesboro, Georgia
Coaches of American football from Mississippi
Players of American football from Mississippi
Baseball coaches from Mississippi
Basketball coaches from Mississippi